The Society for Human Resource Management Middle East and Africa (SHRM MEA) is an entity in Dubai Knowledge Park. It is a wholly owned subsidiary of the Society for Human Resource Management (SHRM), a professional human resources association headquartered in Alexandria, Virginia. Being the largest association in the human resources field, SHRM promotes the role of HR as a profession and provides education, certification and networking to its members.

Today, SHRM has over 340 staff members and over 260,000 members in 165+ countries.

Education 

SHRM MEA offers courses through their delivery partners in Middle East North Africa region to help prepare candidates for the global, competency-based SHRM Certifications, SHRM-Certified Professional (SHRM-CP) and SHRM-Senior Certified Professional (SHRM-SCP). SHRM MEA also introduced the SHRM Master's/Advanced Certificate in Human Resource Management in 2017 which is a professional certificate course based on the SHRM Body of Competency & Knowledge (SHRM-BoCK).

References

External links
 Society for Human Resource Management Website
 UAE Website

Professional associations based in the United States
Organizations established in 1948
Human resource management associations